Chieti is a city and comune (municipality) in Central Italy,  east by northeast of Rome. It is the capital of the province of Chieti in the Abruzzo region.

In Italian, the adjectival form is teatino and inhabitants of Chieti are called teatini. The English form of this name is preserved in that of the Theatines, a Catholic religious order.

History

Mythological origins and etymology 
Chieti is among the most ancient of Italian cities. According to mythological legends, the city was founded by the fellows of Achilles and was named in honor of his mother, Thetis. Other traditions attribute the foundation to Greeks after the destruction of Troy, to Hercules or a queen of Pelasgians. According to Strabo, it was founded by the Arcadians as Thegeate (Θηγεάτη), named after Tegea.

It was called Theate (or Teate in Latin). As Theate Marrucinorum, Chieti was the chief town of the warlike Marrucini.

First prehistoric settlements 
Discoveries of great importance to the prehistory of Abruzzo were those of two hand axes and some Clactonian splinters at Madonna del Freddo's fluvial terraces, traces of settlements dating back to 850,000400,000 years ago. Instead, over Chieti's hill, the oldest archaeological finds of human settlements date back to 5000 BC.

The Italic period 
After being inhabited by Osci, around the 10th century BC, the territory of present-day Chieti was occupied by Marrucini, an Italic tribe probably coming from Sabina. The latter defeated the former, but they preserved their laws, customs and language and became part of the warlike population called Samnites. The Marrucini lived in a small territory, a sort of narrowband, including some mountainous zones of southern Apennines, and probably delimited by the Pescara River's mouth, the Adriatic Sea, the Foro, and the territories of Francavilla al Mare and Tollo. The Romans came into contact with this population, whose land was a vital connection with the Adriatic Sea during the First Samnite War (343 to 341 BC).

Roman history 
Even if Marrucini did not participate in the Samnite League, they supported the Marsi during the Samnite Wars. After the Marrucini were defeated by the Romans, they became loyal allies of the more powerful forces. The first period of Roman domination was characterized by a lack of political rights, but they also participated to Roman life, including in different wars. Marrucini acquired Roman citizenship and their territory was placed under Roman municipal jurisdiction after the Social War, during which Herius Asinius, a famous general from Teate, was defeated and killed. In imperial times, Teate's population reached 60,000 inhabitants (a considerable number for that period) and was enriched with various structures, which are partially visible today: a forum, a 5,000-seat theater with a diameter of about 80 meters, 4,000-seat amphitheater (recently restored and usable today), an aqueduct, and thermae with a large underground cistern. Teate was favored by Via Tiburtina, an important connection to Rome, and by important people and families, such as Asinia gens.

Christianity probably arrived early, also thanks to Via Tiburtina, but there are different traditions regarding who Christinised the town. Also according to tradition, the figure who organized the diocese and established its boundaries was the bishop Justin of Chieti.

Medieval history 
With the fall of the Western Roman Empire, it was destroyed by Visigoths and Heruli. After being controlled by Ostrogoths and Byzantine Empire, it was seat of a gastaldate under the Lombard kings, so it regained importance. Later it was destroyed by Pepin of Italy in 801, and it remained a fief of the Duchy of Benevento for two centuries.

Chieti recovered some political and economic importance under the Norman rule of Southern Italy, a role it kept also under the Hohenstaufen, Angevine and Jiménez dynasty rulers. With Normans the town was repopulated, the cathedral was rebuilt in 1069 and new powerful families arrived, including Valignani, a Norman family of great importance for the history of Chieti. In 1094, Robert Guiscard nominated Chieti "capital of Abruzzi". In October 1097 at Chieti Pope Urban II called for the First Crusade and the conquest of Jerusalem. Chieti remained also loyal to Manfred, who stayed in the town at Christmas in 1255, and Conradin from the Hohenstaufen dynasty.  At the end of the 13th century, Charles I of Anjou enlarged Chieti by creating new neighborhoods and expanding the walls, with new gates being opened. He also divided the region into Abruzzo Citra and Abruzzo Ultra and nominated Chieti capital of Abruzzo Citra. In the 14th century, the Cathedral was renovated, also by building a bell tower, and other churches were built, such as San Francesco al Corso, Santa Maria della Civitella, San Domenico and Sant'Agostino. In the 15th century Alfonso V of Aragon divided the Kingdom into twelve provinces, with Chieti at the head of the provinces of Abruzzi and seat of the viceroy. In 1443, the town obtained the title of "Theate Regia Metropolis Utriusque Aprutinae Provinciae Princeps" (Latin for "Chieti royal town and capital of both the provinces of Abruzzo).

Modern history 
In the 16th century, Chieti maintained important economic relationships with Venice, so a consulate of the Venetian Republic was opened in 1555. Also in this and the following century, noble and rich families from Veneto and Lombardy arrived. In the first half of the 16th century, Gian Pietro Carafa, the future Pope Paul IV, was bishop and archbishop of Chieti. In 1571, Chieti participated to the Battle of Lepanto against the Ottoman Empire.

After a cultural and architectural flourishing during the 17th century, under the aegis of the Counter-Reformation, Chieti was decimated by fatalities from plague in 1656. In this century, Chieti acquired the current configuration that characterizes the old town, especially thanks to the ecclesiastical power. Indeed, in that period new religious orders arrived, which, together with the pre-existing ones, erected new buildings. In 1647, under Spanish domination, there was a short period of feoffment of Chieti.

In the 18th century, Chieti was enriched of new buildings, and its cultural life was characterized by several academies and schools, which contributed to the city's artistic heritage.

Contemporary history 
In 1806 Chieti was turned into a fortress by Napoleon's France, to which the population was generally hostile, even if new administrative structures were created during that occupation. Many people from Chieti supported intellectually the Risorgimento and also fought in 1820, 1848 and 1859. In 1860 the town became part of the newly created Kingdom of Italy, and Victor Emmanuel II was triumphantly received at Chieti.

After Italian Unification, Chieti saw several innovations, such as the creation of banks (including Cassa di Risparmio Marrucina), gas lighting for the entire town, Rome–Sulmona–Pescara railway, Chieti railway station in 1888, railway connections between different parts of the town, the electricity, an aqueduct in 1891, and works of editing of the main street of Chieti with also many demolitions.

Chieti gave many combatants during World War I, with 350 people who died in war.

World War II 
During World War II, Chieti was declared an open city (like Rome) and was not extensively bombed by either side.

It was the site of an infamous POW Camp for British and Commonwealth officers (PG 21) where its commandante – Barela – was later convicted of war crimes for his treatment of POWs. Imprisonment in wartime Italy was tough enough. At some camps conditions were much harder, and the regime more brutal, than at others.

PG 21 was a very large camp through which many POWs passed, often on their way to other camps such as Veano and Fontanellato. It was overcrowded, with little running water, poor sanitation and, in winter, no heating. Shortage of food and warm clothing prompted debate in the UK House of Commons.

The story of the camp between August 1942 and September 1943 is told in a book published in November 2014 and written by Brian Lett, a former chairman of the Monte San Martino Trust and the author of several books, including S.A.S. in Tuscany. He tells of suffering under a violently pro-Fascist regime. The first Commandant personally beat up one recaptured escapee. A pilot was murdered by an Italian guard following his escape attempt. Tunnels were dug, and the prisoners were even prepared to swim through human sewage to try to get out. Somehow, morale remained remarkably high.

After the war, a number of the camp's staff were arrested for war crimes, concluding its unhappy history.

The city at this time welcomed many refugees from the near towns and villages. Allied forces liberated the city on June 9, 1944, one day after the Germans left the city.

Geography and urban landscape 

Chieti is situated about 10 kilometers away from the Adriatic Sea, and with the Majella and Gran Sasso mountains in the background. It is mainly divided into Chieti Alta on the homonymous hill overlooking the Pescara and Alento rivers and the more recent commercial and industrial area, which is called Chieti Scalo and has developed thanks to the Chieti railway station along the ancient layout of Via Tiburtina, in the valley of the Pescara river. Chieti Alta (Italian for “Upper Chieti”), reaches more than 300 meters in elevation on the sea level and includes the old town, with its various historic remains.

Historical streets and squares

Vittorio Emanuele II Square 
As the main square of the old town, it has an elevation of 330 meters, and is located on a part of Chieti's hill called Colle Gallo. Even if it also commonly referred to as Saint Justin Square or "Piazza Grande" (i.e. "Big Square"), its official name is Vittorio Emanuele II Square. This name was given to the square in order to remember Victor Emmanuel II of Italy, who triumphally visited Chieti during the Italian unification, on October 18, 1860.

The square shows the Cathedral, but also other important buildings for Chieti, such as the seat of the comune (the town hall), the tribunal, and Mezzanotte palace. A nobles' palace erected in 1517 has been the official town hall since 1870, even if that building was intensely modified and now only small elements of the old palace remain, including a loggia and some niches.

Corso Marrucino 
Corso Marrucino (Italian for "Marrucinian Street"), the main street of Chieti's center, follows in its path part of the shape of Chieti's hill and is characterized by many buildings of different periods, which sometimes also present porches for pedestrians. Formerly known as "Corso Galiani", it was modified according to a project approved in 1890, which also enlarged the street through different demolitions.

Among the most representative architectures, there are the former seat of the Bank of Italy (built at the beginning of the 20th century with neoclassical taste), the former seat of the local Chamber of Commerce, Industry, Agriculture and Artisanship (completed in 1930 in Neo-Gothic style), and the seat of the Province of Chieti (built between 1914 and 1928). Instead, older buildings are represented by the former Piarists' boarding school, the adjacent San Domenico church and De' Mayo palace. The former Piarists' boarding school, which now hosts the school named Convitto Nazionale Giambattista Vico with its homonymous liceo classico, was founded thanks to a will of 1636. The 16th-century De' Mayo palace, a former seat of the viceroy of Abruzzo, is built in Neapolitan style on Ancient Roman underground galleries, featuring a patio, a big stone portal, and an original Orientalizing turret.

Churches

Chieti Cathedral 
The cathedral dedicated to Saint Justin of Chieti was probably founded in the 8th century and, according to tradition, was re-built by bishop Teodorico I in 840, after the sack by Pepin of Italy. It was again re-built by bishop Attone I in 1069, but of that building only parts of the Romanesque crypt remain. The church was beautified in the 14th and 15th centuries thanks to different bishops. The first three floors of the bell tower were erected in 1335 by Bartolomeo di Giacomo and in 1498 Antonio da Lodi built its bellcote and tented roof. The church was decorated again in the 17th century in the Baroque style. The 1703 Apennine earthquakes destroyed the tented roof of the bell tower and damaged the church, whose aspect was changed by the archbishop Francesco Brancia between 1764 and 1770. In the early 20th century the architect Antonio Cirilli consolidated the bell tower and extensively modified the exterior. The crypt hosts the relics of Saint Justin of Chieti. Close to the cathedral there is the Baroque oratory of the Mount of the Dead Brotherhood, the oldest catholic fraternity of Chieti that was officially acknowledged by Pope Innocent X in 1648.

San Francesco al Corso 
A church dedicated to Saint Francis, which has the traditional Latin cross plan, was probably founded in 1239 thanks to the nobleman Antonio Gizio, who donated his estate to the project. In the second half of the 14th century a new façade was constructed, but it was rebuilt in the 17th century except the top with a rose window. After years of decay, in 1689 they started an extensive restoration which changed the appearance of this church. At the end of the 19th century, the architect Torquato Scaraviglia added an external stairway and another intervention was commissioned by the noblewoman Theresa de Hortalis. The church has a hemispherical dome with trompe-l'œil paintings and ten chapels, whose improvements were financed by some of the most important and ancient families of Chieti.

Santa Chiara 

The Baroque church named Santa Chiara was built for the nuns of the Order of Saint Clare between 1644 and 1720 and presents a Latin cross floor plan with a single nave. The adjacent building, in the past convent with the name of Santo Spirito and now a Carabinieri center, was inhabited by the nuns from 1558 to the Italian Unification, who were for sure present in Chieti since the 14th century. Artworks of great importance preserved in this church are the wooden pulpit with gold and marble decorations, the 18th century organ, the vault painted with a representation of the Assumption of Mary, and the major altarpiece representing the Pentecost.

Santissima Trinità 
Founded and built by a brotherhood with the donations of inhabitants between 1586 and 1587, the church is named after the Holy Trinity. Adjacent to it there were another much older church with a hospital, which was later transformed in a palace (Palazzo Lepri), and an access door to Chieti, which was partly included in the church and transformed in a chapel. The church presents a single nave and a brick façade completed in 1609.

San Domenico 
Along Corso Marrucino street there is San Domenico church, which was formerly dedicated to Saint Anne and built between 1642 and 1672 by the Piarists. The façade is in a Roman Baroque style with a brick Baroque bell tower, and the interiors are rich of decorations and preserve also artworks of another church demolished in 1913, whose name was reused for this church.

Other structures

Teatro Marrucino 

At the beginning of the 19th century, Chieti needed to have a larger and more modern theater to host the increased number of spectators, and the intense drama and opera production of that period. So, because of the inadequacy of the former theater (now named Venetians' Palace), Chieti's administration decided to demolish the Sant'Ignazio Church and build a new theater, which was named "Saint Ferdinand" as an homage to Ferdinand I of the Two Sicilies. It was built from 1813 to 1817, and inaugurated in 1818, with the first opera performed being La Cenerentola. After the Italian unification, the theater was renamed "Teatro Marrucino" (Italian for "Marrucinian Theater") after the pre-Roman Marrucini population, which inhabited the area. In 1872, thanks to the prestige of the institution, some interventions were commissioned, also to add an upper balcony (fifth level). In 1874, a new intervention was financed to improve the interiors, including the ceiling. This was decorated with a wooden rose window, surrounded by flower decorations, allegories of theatrical arts and music, and the portraits of great music or theater geniuses (Goldoni, Pergolesi, Shakespeare, Goethe, Paisiello, Alfieri, Rossini, Verdi). In 1875 the Neapolitan artist Giovanni Ponticelli painted the front curtain, representing the triumph over Dalmatae of Gaius Asinius Pollio.

Porta Pescara 
Porta Pescara is the name of the only doors existing today of the town walls that defended Chieti, one door dating back to the 13th century, the other built in 1797 on the orders of Baron Francesco Farina, an important administrator. The older one, which shows an elegant pointed arch, was realized in stone thanks to the donations collected by the bishop of Chieti. Their name derives from the fact that they gave access to the old road to today's Pescara.

Urban parks

Villa Comunale 
Located at the Southern part of Chieti's hill, Villa Comunale is the major park in Chieti. It was created by merging the gardens of two nobles' villas (Frigerj Villa and Nolli Villa), gardens that started to be created in the first decades of the 19th century. After being bought by the comune, they were opened to the public for the first time in 1868. In the following years also other surrounding properties were bought and all were used to create a big urban park, with plants such as lindens, poplars, and cedars from Florence, which can be seen also today. In the urban park, there are also a fountain bought in a French exposition of 1890, two artificial lakes, and a large bronze First World War memorial realized in 1924. Adjacent to the park, there is the former military hospital, which was located in an Order of Friars Minor's convent founded in 1420.

Archaeological sites 

The territory of Chieti was the seat of Teate, a Roman town which was founded in an area inhabited since Prehistory and flourished in the first century BC, becoming a municipium. There are different Roman sites today in Chieti, including three temples, a theatre, a citadel with an amphitheatre, thermae and underground cisterns. In the citadel earthenware, statues and temple decoration dating back to the Republican Age were discovered, but also an amphiteather of the first century AD. The baths were divided in different rooms, decorated with mosaics that can be partially seen today, and fueled by a close cistern.

Roman theater 
In the area of La Civitella there are the remains of a Roman theatre, which was probably built in the 1st century CE, a period of prosperity. The building had a diameter of about 80 meters and could host about 5,000 spectators, but today they can see little more than the left wing of its cavea with some corridors.

Roman temples 
In 1935 Desiderato Scenna discovered the remains of four ancient Roman temples, the best-preserved one of which was used as a church since the 8th century and renamed after Saint Peter and Saint Paul, whereas another one has been removed to build a post office. The construction of the two twin temples and the smaller one was commissioned by Marcus Vetius Marcellus and his wife Helvidia Priscilla, who were favored by Nero. They do not know what divinities they were dedicated to, even if some scholars proposed that they were consecrated to the Capitoline Triad (Jupiter, Juno and Minerva). The walls are made of bricks, marble slabs, stone slabs and stone tiles, and the plan of the twin temples included a portico and underground spaces.

Underground Chieti 
The thermae are connected to an underground cistern, which is a part of a complex Roman water supply system.  In addition, underneath the 18th-century Palazzo de' Mayo there is the so-called via tecta, an over 4 meters tall ancient Roman underground street, whose function is still debated.

Climate 
Chieti climate is considered genuine Mediterranean. It presents high humidity all year round, with rainy/snowy warm winters and hot and dry summers. Rain is a common event, especially during fall and spring, with accumulations of around  a year. Snowfall is sometimes consistent during winter, with temperatures that often drop below  during winter nights. Fog is a common event during fall and winter, due to very high humidity in these seasons. Wind from the north-east (from the Adriatic sea) carries cold from the Eurasian Steppe, while wind from south-west (from the Tyrrhenian Sea) carries heat from Algerian Desert. Wind is present year-round.

Natural hazards 
Different inhabited areas surrounding Chieti's city center are at risk from landslides (16% of the population lives there) or from wildfires, and some areas close to the Aterno-Pescara are prone to floods. Chieti lies in an area of "average seismicity": in its territory, on hard ground, there is the 10% probability of the maximum peak ground acceleration equal to or greater than 0.145-0.170   in a 50-year period.

Air quality 
From the preliminary 2021 report by ARTA Abruzzo, an environmental agency, it emerges that the levels of air pollutants at Chieti Scalo were under the limits established by law, but the highest values of Abruzzo were recorded in the urban area of Chieti and Pescara. At Chieti Scalo PM 10 reached 50 μg/m2 level 7 times in 2021, while ozone  reached 120 μg/m2 level 4 times in the summer months of the same year and never was detected with a concentration of more than 180 μg/m2. In addition, the concentrations of benzene, carbon monoxide and sulfur trioxide  were recorded and found well under the limits established by law.

Demographics 

According to the statistics conducted by Istat, at the beginning of 2021 people aged 0–19 totaled 15.3% of the population compared to people aged 65 and over who number 27.4%. Always at the beginning of 2021 4.8% of the population (2.359 people) consisted of non-Italians with Romanians (573 people), Albanians (430), Ukrainians (133), Chinese (108), Nigerians (93), Moroccans (90) that were the largest immigrant groups. Of the population without Italian citizenship 62.40% were from European countries, 15.60% from African countries, 15.52% from Asian countries and 6.27% from Americas, with the remaining 0.21% stateless. According to income tax data, in 2016 the per capita income was €14,034. The unemployment rate was 16.02% in 2019, before COVID-19 pandemic.

Economy 
Chieti is a culture and administration-oriented town, with the tourism being a consistent sector: it hosts the seat of the homonymous province, a tribunal, a television station (Rete 8), hospitals, sport venues and different hotels.

The agriculture has remained an important economic sector thanks to horticulture, cereal cultivation, olive cultivation, cultivation of tobacco and cultivation of grapes, from which are made well-known wines, such as Montepulciano d'Abruzzo and Trebbiano d'Abruzzo. Financial services, trade and industry are developed, especially in the production of food, chemicals, paper, building material, packaging, engineering industry, and metallurgy.

According to Italian Revenue Agency, in the first semester 2022 the highest prices for a residential property with average features were recorded in Chieti Scalo (€ 880 - 1300 per square meter), followed by the old town (€ 830 - 1200). Always in Chieti Scalo were recorded the highest monthly rents (€ 4.2 - 6.3 per square meter).

Education 
Chieti has different state and private kindergartens, different state primary and middle schools, a private secondary school (the D.O.G.E. School College) and 7 state secondary schools: Istituto "Luigi di Savoia" (1529 students), Istituto tecnico "Galiani-De Sterlich", Liceo "Isabella Gonzaga", Liceo scientifico "Filippo Masci", Istituto "Umberto Pomilio", Liceo classico "G.B. Vico" and Liceo artistico statale.

The University of Chieti (Università G. d'Annunzio – Chieti e Pescara) is based in Chieti and Pescara and hosts about 35,000 students, covering areas of Architecture, Arts and Philosophy, Economics, Foreign Languages and Literatures, Management, Medicine, Pharmacy, Psychology, Sciences, Social Sciences and Sports Medicine.

Human resources and public safety 
In Chieti the public healthcare system is under the administration of Azienda Sanitaria Locale Lanciano Vasto Chieti, which manages "Santissima Annunziata" polyclinic, Chieti's main hospital, with its emergency department. In addition, there are other private clinics, police and Carabinieri stations, a prison, and a fire station.

Culture 
Abruzzese dialect, which is considered by some linguists a separate language, is still spoken in Chieti.

Good Friday procession 

According to some historians, Good Friday procession, which is considered Italy's oldest religious procession, has taken place in Chieti since 842. From historical documented sources, the origins of its current form date back to the 16th century. It is organized by the Mount of the Dead Brotherhood, an old local fraternity, with different sacred symbols, including an 18th-century wooden Christ sculpture, an Our Lady of Sorrows statue (which is dressed every time for the event by a selected group of women), seven symbols of Passion. The procession starts at the Cathedral at sunset and goes through the principal streets of the old town, where torches on wrought iron tripods are placed. Different people take part, adult and children: the hooded members of  the Mount of the Dead Brotherhood and other brotherhoods of the town, clergymen, members of the Order of the Holy Sepulcher, and a choir and an orchestra performing Miserere by Saverio Selecchy (a local composer of the 18th century).

Museums 

 The National Archaeological Museum of Abruzzo is surrounded by an urban park and is located in the former 19th-century Neoclassical residence of the Frigerj family. The rooms of the museum, which hosts the ancient Warrior of Capestrano, are dedicated to: Italic sculpture, Roman sculpture, a numismatic collection, a collection of antiquities created by Giovanni Pansa, the Vestini, the Peligni, the Marrucini and the Carricini.
 The Archaeological Museum La Civitella is close to the Roman amphitheatre and is focused on the Marrucini and the ancient history of Chieti.
 The University Museum of History of Biomedical Sciences is managed by the University of Chieti-Pescara and exposes prehistoric finds, rocks, minerals, a malacological collection, medical devices of the early 20th century and a collection of contemporary art. The museum is located in the former local house of the Opera Nazionale Dopolavoro, an example of fascist architecture.
 The art museum dedicated to Costantino Barbella is located in an 18th-century palace and houses frescoes, sculptures, paintings, and pottery from the 15th to the 20th centuries, including a collection of Maiolica from Castelli.
 The Museo Diocesano Teatino (Italian for "Diocesan Museum of Chieti") is located in the 17th-century Church of Saint Dominic and hosts frescoes from the 14th to the 16th century, wooden statues and paintings.

Government 

In the year 2021, the comune has debts amounting to more than 78 million euros.

Transport

Public transport 
The public transport bus service of Chieti is provided by companies Società Unica Abruzzese di Trasporto and La Panoramica, which manages also the Chieti trolleybus system.

Main roads 
The territory between Pescara and Chieti is crossed by two motorways, the Autostrada A14 and the Autostrada A25 (important for people traveling to Rome).

In addition to these two motorways, there are other important road connections that allow to reach Chieti from the surrounding territory:
 Raccordo autostradale RA12
 Strada statale 5, also named after Via Tiburtina
 Strada statale 81: it connects Chieti to Teramo
 Strada statale 656: it connects the upper part of Chieti to the motorways

Railways and railway stations 
Chieti Scalo is crossed by the Rome–Sulmona–Pescara railway and has two train stations, the Chieti railway station and the smaller Chieti–Madonna delle Piane railway station. A railway connecting the old town and Chieti Scalo was closed in 1943.

Nearby ports and airports 
Chieti is about 12 kilometers from the Abruzzo Airport and 17 kilometers from the Port of Pescara.

Notable people 
Herius Asinius – Commander of the Marrucini
Gaius Asinius Pollio (75 BC / AD 4) – Roman soldier, politician, orator, poet, playwright, literary critic and historian
Saint Justin of Chieti
Severino Di Giovanni – Anarchist who exiled himself to Argentina in 1922
Ferdinando Galiani – Economist
Sergio Marchionne – Former CEO of Ferrari and Fiat Chrysler Automobiles
Alessandro Valignano – Jesuit missionary who helped the introduction of Catholicism to the Far East
Pierluigi Zappacosta – Co-founder of Logitech, Venture Partner with Noventi, President/CEO of Sierra Sciences
Luciano Odorisio – Actor, movie director
Costantino Barbella – Sculptor
Lorenzo Parente - professional wrestler

Gallery

See also

Chieti railway station
Trolleybuses in Chieti
Asinia gens

References

External links

Site of National Museum Archaeological of Abruzzi Villa Frigerii
Official site of Biomedical Museum
Official site of Archaeological Museum "La Civitella"
Official site of Art Museum "Costantino Barbella"
Italy's most important Easter Procession in Chieti
Photo Gallery 

 
Cities and towns in Abruzzo